Mark Simon Eastwood (born 14 March 1971) is a British Conservative Party politician who was elected as the Member of Parliament (MP) for Dewsbury in the 2019 general election.

Early life 
Eastwood grew up in Thornhill Lees, before moving to the Wilton Estate in Batley at the age of six. He joined the Conservative Party at the age of seventeen, while he was a student at Batley Boys High School, now Upper Batley High School.

Career 
Eastwood had a total of six unsuccessful attempts standing for the Dewsbury East ward of Kirklees Council. Before he became an MP, he worked for a company which provides medical furniture and equipment to the NHS, and served as Yorkshire and Humber representative of the Conservative Workers & Trade Unionists. Eastwood was elected as the MP for Dewsbury at the 2019 general election, gaining the seat from Labour's Paula Sherriff.

He is a member of the Regulatory Reform Committee and the Committee on the Future Relationship with the European Union. Eastwood is also a member of the APPGs on British Muslims, Football, and the Furniture Industry, as well as being a member of the Parliamentary Football Club.

His first overseas trip was to Pakistan in 2020 as part of an all-party delegation. On 23 August 2021, Prime Minister Boris Johnson appointed him as the UK's trade envoy to the country.

Political views
Eastwood identifies as a "moderate, compassionate Conservative". He is a supporter of Brexit, having worked on local Vote Leave campaigns during the 2016 referendum.

Personal life
Eastwood has a wife, two children and is a Leeds United season ticket holder. He has been known to DJ at private events held locally.

References

External links

Living people
Conservative Party (UK) MPs for English constituencies
UK MPs 2019–present
British Eurosceptics
People from Batley
People from Dewsbury
1971 births